A procedural or procedural drama is a cross-genre type of literature, film, or television program which places emphasis on technical detail. A documentary film may also be written in a procedural style to heighten narrative interest.

Television programs in this genre focus on how crimes are solved, and are centered around a law enforcement agency, legislative body, or court of law. Some dramas include a lab or high-tech conference room where the main characters meet to work out the problem. Shows usually have an episodic format that does not necessarily require the viewer to have seen previous episodes. Episodes typically have a self-contained (also referred to as 'stand-alone') plot that is introduced, developed, and resolved within the same episode.
 
The procedural format is popular around the world. In 2011, the director of a TV consultancy said, "The continuing trend is for procedurals because they use a predictable structure." Due to their stand-alone episodic nature, they are more accessible to new viewers than serials. Self-contained episodes also make it easier for viewers to return to a show if they have missed some episodes. In general, procedural dramas can usually be re-run with little concern for episode order.

Procedurals are often criticized for being formulaic. Procedurals are also generally less character-driven than serialized shows. However, some procedurals have more character emphasis than is typical of the format. Some may occasionally feature a storyline stretching over several episodes (often called a story arc).

A popular subgenre is the police procedural.

Types of media

Television

Fiction 
In television, "procedural" specifically refers to a genre of programs in which a problem is introduced, investigated and solved all within the same episode. These shows tend to be hour-long dramas, and are often (though not always) police or crime related.

The general formula for a police procedural involves the commission or discovery of a crime at the beginning of the episode, the ensuing investigation, and the arrest or conviction of a perpetrator at the end of the episode.

Modern examples of this genre are the Law & Order, CSI & NCIS franchises. House is an example of a non-crime-related procedural.

  Procedural dramas are generally very popular in broadcast syndication because the lack of long-term storylines makes it easier for viewers to tune in for just one episode without feeling lost.
  Procedurals are sometimes noted for their lack of character development, with little attention being paid to the lives of the recurring characters outside of their jobs.

Non-fiction 
 Non-fiction science procedurals such as the PBS Secrets of the Dead series or Court TV's Forensic Files take a viewer step-by-step through an investigation, much like a fictional procedural.

Literature 
 Police procedural: the best known variety, a large subgenre of mystery fiction. Lawrence Treat's 1945 novel V as in Victim is cited as perhaps the first "true" police procedural.
 Military procedural: a term used by Publishers Weekly in 1989 referring to Ralph Peters' novel Red Army
 War procedural: an example is the film The Dam Busters, 1955, which was called a war procedural by Richard Gilliam in Allmovie.
 Tom Clancy's novels are sometimes called war procedurals or political procedurals.
 Science procedural: Science fiction novels or stories may have sequences of scientific procedure.  An example would be Timescape, written by the scientist and author Gregory Benford.
 A relatively recent subgenre is the presidential procedural; a novel which focuses on the office of the US presidency, and the activities of its occupant.  Examples would be Executive Orders by Tom Clancy, The President's Plane Is Missing by Robert Serling, and Maximum Vigilance by Steve Pieczenik.

Television examples
This list provides examples of procedural dramas; it is not exhaustive.

 9-1-1 (2018–present)
 9-1-1 Lone Star (2020–present)
 Adam-12 (1968–1975)
 Battle Creek (2015)
 Beauty & the Beast (2012–2016)
 Blue Bloods (2010–present) 
 Body of Proof (2011–2013)
 Bones (2005–2017)
 Castle (2009–2016)
 Charlie's Angels (1976–1981)
 Chicago Med (2015–present)
 Chicago P.D. (2014–present)
 Chicago Justice (2017)
 The Closer (2005–2012)
 Cold Case (2003–2010)
 Columbo (1968–1978)
 Common Law (2012)
 Conviction (2006)
 Criminal Minds (2005–2020)
 Criminal Minds: Beyond Borders (2016–2017)
 Criminal Minds: Suspect Behavior (2011)
 CSI: Crime Scene Investigation (2000–2015)
 CSI: Cyber (2015–2016)
 CSI: Miami (2002–2012)
 CSI: NY (2004–2013)
 Deadline (2000–2001)
 Dragnet (1951–1959; 1967–1970)
 Elementary (2012–2019)
 Emergency! (1972–1979)
 FBI (2018–present)
 FBI: Most Wanted (2020–present)
 Hawaii Five-0 (2010–2020)
 Hawaii Five-O (1968–1980)
 Homicide: Life on the Street (1993–1999)
 House (2004–2012; medical procedural drama)
 Hill Street Blues (1981–1987)
 In Plain Sight (2008–2012)
 Instinct (2018–2019)
 Ironside (1967–1975)
 iZombie (2015–2019)
 JAG (1995–2005)
 Jo (2013)
 Law & Order (1990–2010)
 Law & Order: Special Victims Unit (1999–present)
 Law & Order: Criminal Intent (2001–2011)
 Law & Order: Trial by Jury (2005–2006)
 Law & Order: UK (2009–2014)
 Law & Order: LA (2010–2011)
 Lie to Me (2009–2011)
 Lucifer (2016–2021)
 Major Crimes (2012–2018)
 Matlock (1986–1995)
 Miami Vice (1984–1990)
 Midsomer Murders (1997–present)
 McCallum (1995–1998)
 The Mentalist (2008–2015)
 Monk (2002–2009)
 Murder, She Wrote (1984–1996)
 Naked City (TV series) (1958-1963)
 Nash Bridges (1996–2001)
 NCIS (2003–present)<ref
name="nomystery"/>
 NCIS: Los Angeles (2009–present)
 NCIS: New Orleans (2014–2021)
 NCIS: Hawai'i (2021–present)
 New Tricks (2003–2015)
 New York Undercover (1994–1998)
 Numb3rs (2005–2010)
 NYPD Blue (1993–2005)
 Perception (2012–2015)
 Perry Mason (1957–1966) 
 Person of Interest (2011–2016)
 The Practice (1997–2004)
 Prodigal Son (2019–2021)
 Psych (2006–2014)
 Rebus (2000–2007)
 Rizzoli & Isles (2010–2016)
 The Rookie (2018–present)
 Southland (2009–2013)
 Suits (2011–2019)
 S.W.A.T. (2017–present)
 Taggart (1983–2010)
 Taxi Brooklyn (2014)
 The Good Doctor (2017–present)
 The Unit (2006–2009)
 Third Watch (1999–2005)
 White Collar (2009−2014)
 Without a Trace (2002–2009)

See also 
 Crime fiction
 Hard science fiction
 Legal drama
 Murder mystery 
 Police procedural
 Serial (literature)
 Serial (radio and television)

References 

Television genres
Television terminology
 Procedural drama
Drama
Literary genres